The blonde ray or blonde skate (Raja brachyura) is a species of ray fish in the family Rajidae.

Distribution

The Blonde ray lives in the Eastern Atlantic Ocean, at depths of 10-380 m. It is found occasionally in the Mediterranean Sea as well.

Description 
Like all rays, the blonde ray has a flattened body with broad, wing-like pectoral fins. The body is kite-shaped with a short tail (hence the specific name brachyura, from Ancient Greek words meaning "short tail"). 

Life cycle 
Oviparous, with embryos feeding only on yolk. The females lay about 30 egg-cases between February and November, using shallower coastal waters as nursing-grounds.

Human use

Blonde rays are currently fished for human consumption, with a record weight of  recorded in Cobh, Ireland in 2008.

See also

References

External links
 
Fishbase Database: Raja brachyura

blonde ray
Fish of the East Atlantic
Fish of the Mediterranean Sea
Fish of the North Sea
Near threatened biota of Africa
Near threatened biota of Europe
blonde ray